Torrid Noon (translit. Goreshto pladne) is a Bulgarian drama film released in 1966, directed by Zako Heskija. It was entered into the 1965 Cannes Film Festival.

Cast
 Plamen Nakov - Aleko
 Peter Slabakov - Generalat
 Grigor Vachkov - Selyanin
 Rousy Chanev - Voynik
 Gerasim Mladenov - Chinovnik
 Vladislav Molerov - Kapitanat
 Kalina Antonova - Devoyka
 Ivan Bratanov - Selyanin
 Dimitar Panov
 Naicho Petrov - Pasazher
 Dora Staeva - Mayka
 Kyamil Kyuchukov
 Lachezar Yankov
 Aszparuh Sarjev
 Lyubomir Kirilov
 Dimitar Manchev

References

External links

1965 films
1960s Bulgarian-language films
1965 drama films
Bulgarian black-and-white films
Films directed by Zako Heskija
Bulgarian drama films